= Chesconessex, Virginia =

Unincorporated community in Virginia, United States

Coordinates: 37°45′07″N 75°45′59″W

Chesconessex is an unincorporated community in Accomack County, Virginia, United States.
